List table of the properties and districts listed on the California Historical Landmarks within Riverside County, southern California.

Note: Click the "Map of all coordinates" link to the right to view a Google map of all properties and districts with latitude and longitude coordinates in the table below.

Listings

|}

See also

List of California Historical Landmarks
National Register of Historic Places listings in Riverside County, California

References

External links
 NoeHill Travels in California: Historic Sites in Riverside County for a listing of NRHP and California landmarks

List of California Historical Landmarks

Landmarks
Landmarks
.